The UK Albums Chart is one of many music charts compiled by the Official Charts Company that calculates the best-selling albums of the week in the United Kingdom. Before 2004, the chart was only based on the sales of physical albums. This list shows albums that peaked in the Top 10 of the UK Albums Chart during 2000, as well as albums which peaked in 1999 and 2001 but were in the top 10 in 2000. The entry date is when the album appeared in the top ten for the first time (week ending, as published by the Official Charts Company, which is six days after the chart is announced).

Two albums from 1998 and eighteen albums from 1999 remained in the top 10 for several weeks at the beginning of the year, while Chocolate Starfish and the Hot Dog Flavored Water by Limp Bizkit, Onka's Big Moka by Toploader and White Ladder by David Gray were all released in 2000 but did not reach their peak until 2001. ...Baby One More Time by Britney Spears, Northern Star by Melanie C and Unplugged by The Corrs were the albums from 1999 to reach their peak in 2000. artists scored multiple entries in the top 10 in 2000. Coldplay and Craig David were among the many artists who achieved their first UK charting top 10 album in 2000.

The first new number-one album of the year was by Rise by Gabrielle. Overall, twenty-four different albums peaked at number one in 2000, with twenty-four unique artists hitting that position.

Background

Best-selling albums
The Beatles had the best-selling album of the year with 1. Sing When You're Winning by Robbie Williams came in second place. Eminem's The Marshall Mathers LP, Coast to Coast from Westlife and Play by Moby made up the top five. Albums by Craig David, Texas, Coldplay, Whitney Houston and Madonna were also in the top ten best-selling albums of the year.

Top-ten albums
Key

Entries by artist
The following table shows artists who achieved two or more top 10 entries in 2000, including albums that reached their peak in 1999. The figures only include main artists, with featured artists and appearances on compilation albums not counted individually for each artist. The total number of weeks an artist spent in the top ten in 2000 is also shown.

See also
2000 in British music
List of number-one albums from the 2000s (UK)

References
General

Specific

External links
2000 album chart archive at the Official Charts Company (click on relevant week)

United Kingdom top 10 albums
Top 10 albums
2000